Reidville Academy Faculty House is a historic house in Reidville, South Carolina. It was listed on the National Register of Historic Places in 1997.

History
The house was built around 1860 for the principal of the Reidville Male High School, which was later called the Reidville Male Academy. The house is a two-story, brick raised cottage in the Greek Revival style. It is covered with stucco that is scored to look like stone blocks.

References

National Register of Historic Places in Spartanburg County, South Carolina
Greek Revival houses in South Carolina
Victorian architecture in South Carolina
Houses completed in 1905
Houses in Spartanburg County, South Carolina
Houses on the National Register of Historic Places in South Carolina
1905 establishments in South Carolina